Walter Blakeley (1894–1941) was a British cinematographer.

Selected filmography
 The Lincoln Cycle (1917)
 Shifting Sands (1922)
 The Highbinders (1926)
 The First Born (1928)
 Stranglehold (1931)
 No Funny Business (1933)
 Irish Hearts (1934)
 Dick Turpin (1934)
 Street Song (1935)
 Tomorrow We Live (1936)

References

Bibliography
Low, Rachael. Filmmaking in 1930s Britain. George Allen & Unwin, 1985.

External links

1894 births
1941 deaths
British cinematographers